Kisumu Central is a constituency in Kenya. It is one of seven constituencies in Kisumu County.

References 

Constituencies in Kisumu County